Bala Kuh is a village in Balkh Province in northern Afghanistan.
It has a population of 30,419 and a total area of 652,230 km.  The capital city is Kabul and the currency is Afghanis.

See also 
Balkh Province

References

External links
Satellite map at Maplandia.com

Populated places in Balkh Province